Henri Gouzien was born in 1889 in Lorient in Morbihan. Most of his recorded work involves sculptural work for war memorials in the Morbihan area and many of his compositions include a grieving woman in Breton costume.

Works

References

1889 births
People from Lorient
Breton artists
Year of death missing